Craugastor anciano was a species of frog in the family Craugastoridae. It was endemic to the Cordillera de Celaque in Honduras. Its natural habitats were moist premontane and lower montane forests. It lived on the ground along streams.

Craugastor anciano was an extremely rare species that is now considered extinct. Chytridiomycosis is a possible reason, although habitat loss may have also contributed.

References

anciano
Endemic fauna of Honduras
Amphibians of Honduras
Frogs of North America
Amphibian extinctions since 1500
Amphibians described in 1988
Taxonomy articles created by Polbot